The Santa Maria Valley Railroad  is a  shortline railroad that interchanges with the Union Pacific Railroad's (former Southern Pacific) Coast Line at Guadalupe, California. As of 2006, the Railroad is owned by the Coast Belle Rail Corporation.

Traffic
The TRC handles 2,000 cars annually (1996 estimate).  Commodities hauled include:
Asphalt
Fertilizer
Fresh and Frozen Food products
Gypsum wallboard
Lumber
Machinery
Petroleum Products
Plastic
Scrap iron

Prior traffic included:
Beer
Sugar and Sugar beets

Passenger Service
Special passenger service was only offered during World War II on the Air Base branch to transport military personnel to the Santa Maria Army Air Base for training.  The Air Base branch was constructed in 1943. Excursions were offered for the first time on the SMVRR in November 2006, continuing into 2007.

History
The SMV was incorporated on July 14, 1911 as the Santa Maria Valley Railwayat Los Angeles, California with A. A. Dougherty listed as President.

The first  of track, from the Southern Pacific connection at Guadalupe to Betteravia Junction, was actually built by the SP in August 1899 to get to a sugar mill.  The SP leased the track to the SMV years later.  From Betteravia the SMV built to Santa Maria and on to Roadamite.  The SMV also had branches running from Stowell to Air Base, Suey to Rosemary Farms and Rex to Gates.

By 1925 the railway traffic had steeply declined and the railway went bankrupt.  Captain George Allan Hancock , a principal of the Dominion Oil Company, purchased the railroad for $75,000 at a Sheriff's auction. The railroad was then reorganized as the Santa Maria Valley Railroad in 1926.  Until 2006, the railroad was owned by Captain G. Allan Hancock's estate.

The track from Gates to Roadamite was abandoned in 1950.

The last run of No. 21, Captain Hancock's favorite steam locomotive, was in February 1962.  Captain Hancock took the throttle one last time.  Walt Disney was in the cab with Captain Hancock.

Baldwin 21 currently is undergoing restoration in Astoria, Oregon to be returned to excursion service.

The Union Sugar Beet plant closed in 1993, ending the beet train era.

In 1999 the G. Allan Hancock Estate gained full control of the SMV.  The assets of the railroad were sold to Coast Belle Rail Corporation in 2006, ending an 81-year ownership by the Hancock family.

Other than 21, three other steam locomotives are in existence. Following a successful restoration, 205 was sold the engine to the Albany and Eastern Railroad in Oregon and is used on the Santiam Excursion Trains. 100 is also in Oregon, but has not yet entered restoration. 1000 resides on Static Display in Griffith Park at Travel Town.

Timeline
July 14, 1911 Santa Maria Valley Railway organized
August 23, 1911 grading commenced
September 28, 1911 laying rails commenced
March 15, 1912 construction completed
October 7, 1911 first train operated
1926 Santa Maria Valley Railway reorganized as the Santa Maria Valley Railroad
1950 track abandoned between Gates and Roadamite
2006 Purchased by the Coast Belle Rail Corp. from the descendants of G.A. Hancock family
2008 All track east of McClelland Street now vacated. Offices moved to Betteravia Industrial Park (at the site of the old sugar mill).

Route

Main Route
Guadalupe (interchange with UP - former SP) originally leased to SMV by SP.
Betteravia Junction
Carr
Pacer
Midco
Santa Maria

Air Base Branch (Santa Maria Army Air Base)
Santa Maria
Airbase (also with a spur to Pesco)

Betteravia Branch
Betteravia Junction
Gumm (Iremel)
Betteravia

Rosemary Branch (abandoned)
Santa Maria
Suey
Rosemary (Rosemary Farms)
Battles

Gates Branch (abandoned)
Rosemary (named after owner G. Allan Hancock's daughter)
Rex
Gates
Roadamite (Gates - Roadamite abandoned in 1950)

Motive Power
The SMV has 5 locomotives:
SMV #70 a GE 70-ton switcher built in January 1950 (Builder No. 30381) acquired for operation in November 1972 from Fort Dodge DM&S
SMV #80 a GE 70-ton switcher built in December 1953 (Builder No. 32207) acquired for parts for its fleet of 70-ton switchers in November 1972 from Fort Dodge DM&S
SMV #1801 an EMD GP9 built in June 1959 (Builder No. 25314) Built for Milwaukee Road as their #319
BUGX #1322, a former Atchison Topeka & Santa Fe (AT&SF) EMD GP7(u), still with the original Blue and Gold Paint Scheme (leased)
FWRY 3501 EMD GP35, Purchased from the Fillmore and Western Railway in 2021.

The SMV operated five 70 ton switchers and one U6B that were acquired between 1948-1959.

Roster from the Friends of the SMV: https://friends-smvrr.org/images/history/SMVRR-roster.pdf

Also see The Diesel Shop Roster: https://www.thedieselshop.us/SMVR.HTML

See also

List of California railroads

References

External links
Official Santa Maria Valley Railroad homepage
Friends of the Santa Maria Valley Railroad
Abandonment of 5 miles in 2002
UPRR profile of SMV

Additional reading

California railroads
Transportation in Santa Barbara County, California